The Churchill Archives Centre (CAC) at Churchill College at the University of Cambridge is one of the largest repositories in the United Kingdom for the preservation and study of modern personal papers. It is best known for housing the papers of former British prime minister Winston Churchill.

In addition to housing the personal papers of Churchill, the centre also houses the private papers of other notable figures, including former British prime minister Baroness Thatcher, Ernest Bevin, Enoch Powell, Lord Kinnock, Sir John Colville, Lord Hankey, Admiral Lord Fisher, Field Marshal Lord Slim, Sir John Cockcroft, Sir James Chadwick, Professor Lise Meitner, Dr Rosalind Franklin, and Sir Frank Whittle.

The centre is the national and Commonwealth memorial to Winston Churchill and has been awarded designated status by the Museums, Libraries and Archives Council. 

The centre is open to the public. Its mission is to preserve the collections in its care for future generations and make them as accessible as possible.

Holdings

Collections 

Although it is the papers of Sir Winston Churchill that give the Churchill Archives Centre its name, this institution houses nearly 600 collections containing records of the lives of soldiers, sailors, airmen, journalists, reformers and activists, public servants, diplomats, physicists, chemists, biologists and their families.

Subjects
The wide range of the collections allows the exploration of a similarly wide range of subjects. For example, most aspects of the Second World War can be traced there, and records relating to the birth (with Churchill’s so-called Iron Curtain Speech) and death of the Cold War are stored in CAC archival boxes.

The CAC provides a valuable resource for the study of military, political and diplomatic history, and international relations, social and cultural history and the history of colonialism, labour, science, and women, particularly in a British context. There are letters, photographs, diaries and scrapbooks from families, public figures and the general public.

Types of documents
The collections at the Churchill Archives Centre include speeches, memoranda, reports, minutes, letters, postcards, diaries, appointment books, telegrams and memoirs, diagrams, maps, sketches and doodles, audio and video recordings, and photographs.  The Archives Centre attempts to preserve these whilst rendering them accessible to the public. Among the figures, events and broader topics included in CAC's holdings are:

People

Events and broader topics

Access
The Churchill Archives Centre is open to the public, though appointments must be made in advance to guarantee a place in the Reading Room. The aim of the Centre is to open up as much material for research as possible, but there may be closures for conservation or other reasons.

Preservation
A core policy of the Centre is to preserve archival material as far as possible for the use of present and future generations, recognising that some collections are used very heavily and others contain badly damaged items. Although most of the archive material is in the form of loose papers, it also includes large photograph albums, posters and plans, cine film, and artifacts such as one of Margaret Thatcher’s handbags. Only a small proportion of the papers are significantly damaged, but they need attention to make them usable. Many need intervention to render them chemically stable for long-term preservation.  Sometimes the damage is extremely disfiguring and dramatic.

Conservation staff at the Centre undertake the following treatments to conserve damaged archive material:
 Surface dry cleaning to remove abrasive, oily and acidic dirt;
 Relaxation and flattening of creased and warped items;
 Washing out acids or impurities from paper and photographs to stabilize them chemically;
 De-acidification of acidic and brittle papers and the addition of alkaline "buffers";
 Repairs to tears and weak areas using fine, acid-free tissues and papers and reversible adhesives;
 Removal of pressure-sensitive tapes, mounts, and other things that can cause damage over time;
 Stabilization of mouldy material;
 Housing in conservation bindings.

Key to preserving the archives is the specially equipped storage facility or strongroom, which features a sophisticated fire detection system and suppresses fire using a mixture of inert Inergen gases.  The strongroom is monitored for insect pests and provides a stable, cool, and relatively dry environment with clean, filtered air.

The archives themselves are stored in protective packages made from high-quality, acid-free (alkaline buffered) paper and card, and sometimes inert polyester film. This provides both physical protection and a safe, non-acidic environment. Sturdy boxes are used to further shield files from light, dust, and disaster.

To maintain the physical integrity of the archives, all staff, visitors and readers are instructed on their correct handling, and the exhibition of original material is strictly controlled.

History
Churchill College began to collect papers in 1965, beginning with those of Clement Attlee. The Archives Centre was purpose-built in 1973 to house the papers of Winston Churchill. His papers relating to his life after 1945 were given to the college by his wife, but those concerning his life before 1945 remained in family ownership (though housed in the Archives Centre) until 1995, when they were bought for the nation. The grant to purchase the papers included funding for a dedicated team of archivists to catalogue them. The catalogue took a team of five archivists five years to complete. It was finished at the end of 2000 and was made available online 12 months later. More recently, the Churchill Papers have been digitised.

The Centre continued to collect personal papers from other figures from the fields of politics, the military, diplomacy, technology and science. By the end of the 20th century it was running out of storage space. In 1997, when Margaret Thatcher gave her papers to the Centre, funding was raised to build a new wing to house them and to enable the Centre to continue adding to its collections in the 21st century.

The Archives Centre has collaborated with organisations around the world on projects and exhibitions about Winston Churchill. A joint exhibition was held with the Library of Congress. In 2006, catalogues to all the collections except those of Churchill and Thatcher were made available on the Cambridge-based Janus webserver.

The Directors of the Archives Centre have been as follows:
 Correlli Barnett, 1977–1995
 Piers Brendon, 1995–2001
 Allen George Packwood, 2001–Present

See also
 Churchill War Rooms in Westminster
 The Churchill Centre and Churchill Museum at the War Rooms
 Chartwell – Churchill's family home, now administered by the National Trust

References

External links
 Churchill Archives Centre home page
Churchill: World War Two Speeches - UK Parliament Living Heritage
 The Churchill Papers Online Catalogue
 Bloomsbury Academic's Digital Churchill Archive
 Archivesearch online catalogues for all other collections
 British Diplomatic Oral History Programme (BDOHP) 
 Churchill College
 The Churchill Centre in Washington D.C.
 Churchill War Rooms
 The National Archives, UK

Archives in Cambridgeshire
Churchill College, Cambridge
Organisations based in Cambridge
Monuments and memorials to Winston Churchill
Oral history